The Other Press is the independent student newspaper of Douglas College, a multi-campus public college in British Columbia, Canada.

The Other Press was founded in 1976, and has been independent of the Douglas Students' Union (DSU) since 1978. Normally, college newspapers serve as training vehicles for journalism majors; this publication is highly unusual (and perhaps unique) in the sense that the school has no journalism program, and no faculty member oversees the newspaper's production; it is written and edited almost exclusively by whichever Douglas College students (or community members) wish to participate. Consequently, the editorial quality of The Other Press may vary significantly from one issue to the next.  

As of 2017, the five sections are: News, Arts, Life & Style, Opinions, and Humour

The newspaper is a registered society under the Society Act of British Columbia. It is governed by an eight-person board of directors appointed at their Annual General Meeting (AGM), which takes place at the end of the fiscal year. The publication receives funding from a student levy collected through tuition fees and advertising revenue. The Other Press is also a member of the Canadian University Press (CUP), a syndicate of student newspapers across Canada.

The Other Press appears weekly during the fall and winter semesters (though less frequently during examination periods) and monthly in the summer. Newspaper issues are distributed throughout Douglas College's New Westminster and Coquitlam campuses.

See also
Douglas College
Canadian University Press
Student Newspaper
List of student newspapers in Canada
List of newspapers in Canada

External links
Official website

Student newspapers published in British Columbia
Publications established in 1976
1976 establishments in British Columbia
Weekly newspapers published in British Columbia